65 Arietis is a star in the northern constellation of Aries, located near Tau Arietis. 65 Arietis, abbreviated '65 Ari', is the Flamsteed designation. It has an apparent visual magnitude of 6.07, which, according to the Bortle Dark-Sky Scale, means it is faintly visible to the naked eye when viewed from dark suburban skies. The star is moving closer to the Earth with a heliocentric radial velocity of around −6 km/s.

This is an ordinary A-type main sequence star with a stellar classification of A1 V. It has about 2.45 times the mass of the Sun and shines with 40 times the Sun's luminosity. This energy is being radiated into outer space at an effective temperature of 10.300 K, giving it the white-hued glow of an A-type star. It is roughly 23% of the way through its lifetime on the main sequence of core hydrogen burning stars.

References

External links
 HR 1027
 Image 65 Arietis

A-type main-sequence stars
Aries (constellation)
Durchmusterung objects
Arietis, 65
021050
015870
1027